Santon Bridge is a small village in Copeland, Cumbria, England, at a bridge over the River Irt. The civil parish is called Irton with Santon. The population of this civil parish as at the 2011 census was 316. The Bridge Inn is the venue for the annual World's Biggest Liar competition.

See also

Listed buildings in Irton with Santon

References

External links
 Cumbria County History Trust: Irton (nb: provisional research only – see Talk page

Villages in Cumbria
Borough of Copeland